Claudio Tello (28 September 1963 – 15 April 2014) was a Chilean footballer who played as a defender.

Career
Tello played club football for Aviación, Cobreloa, Deportes Antofagasta and Provincial Osorno.

He also earned 8 international caps for Chile.

Later life and death
Tello died on 15 April 2014 at the age of 50, from cancer.

References

1963 births
2014 deaths
Chilean footballers
Chile international footballers
C.D. Aviación footballers
Cobreloa footballers
C.D. Antofagasta footballers
Provincial Osorno footballers
Association football defenders
Deaths from cancer in Chile